Frederick Smith (March 1, 1773 – October 6, 1830) was a Pennsylvania lawyer.  He was state Attorney General (1823–8) and a justice of the state's Supreme Court (1828–30).

Biography and career

Smith was born in the Germantown area of Philadelphia.  After graduating in 1792 from  the University of Pennsylvania, he worked and studied in the office of Jared Ingersoll, a signer of the U. S. Constitution who was then the newly appointed state Attorney General.  In 1794, Smith moved to Reading, and practiced law in Berks, Lehigh, Northampton, and Schuylkill counties.

In 1809 he was part of the team defending, unsuccessfully, the controversial Susanna Cox.

In 1823, Governor Shulze offered Smith the position of Secretary of the Commonwealth, which he declined, but then offered Smith the position of state Attorney General, which he accepted.  He served until 1828, when he resigned upon being appointed to the state Supreme Court, where he served until his death in 1830.

References

Further reading
 Samuel Hazard (ed.), The Register of Pennsylvania, volume VI, July 1830–January 1831, p. 265 Obituary

1773 births
1830 deaths
University of Pennsylvania alumni
Pennsylvania Attorneys General
Pennsylvania lawyers
Pennsylvania state court judges
Lawyers from Philadelphia
19th-century American lawyers